The Memorial Temple of the Birth of Christ (Hram-pametnik „Rozhdestvo Hristovo“), better known as the Shipka Memorial Church or Shipka Monastery is a Bulgarian Orthodox church built near the town of Shipka in Stara Planina between 1885 and 1902 to Antoniy Tomishko's design in the seventeenth-century Russian style, under the direction of architect Alexander Pomerantsev. It is, together with the other parts of the Shipka Monument complex, dedicated to the Russian and Bulgarian soldiers that died for the liberation of Bulgaria in the Russo-Turkish War, 1877-78.

The temple was officially opened on  September 28, 1902, in the presence of Russian Army generals and many honourable guests. The opening and consecration of the Shipka Memorial Church coincided with the 25-year anniversary of the Battles of Shipka Pass. In 1970, the temple was proclaimed a national monument of culture.

The church's bell tower reaches a height of 53 m and its bells, the heaviest of which weighs 12 tons, were cast from the cartridges that were collected after the battles. In the temple itself, the names of the Russian regiments and Bulgarian volunteers are inscribed on 34 marble plates. The remains of the perished are laid in 17 stone sarcophagi in the church's crypt.

Gallery

Notes

Churches in Bulgaria
Churches completed in 1902
20th-century Eastern Orthodox church buildings
20th-century churches in Bulgaria
Battle of Shipka Pass